In Marvel Comics, Miss America may refer to:

Miss America (Madeline Joyce), the golden age character first published by Marvel's predecessor Timely Comics
Miss America (America Chavez), the modern age character

See also
 Miss America (disambiguation)